Chicomba is a town and municipality in the province of Huíla, Angola. The municipality had a population of 131,807 in 2014.

References

Populated places in Huíla Province
Municipalities of Angola